Re-tooling or retooling may refer to:

 Changing tools
 Tool management change
 Soft retooling
 Reboot (fiction)

See also
 Tooling (disambiguation)